Marco Antonio Abascal Barria (born 15 February 1960) is a Chilean former professional footballer.

Early life
Abascal began playing football in Viña del Mar in Chile, eventually joining the youth side of Chilean club Everton de Viña del Mar. He later moved to Canada and began playing for Club Uruguay Toronto, winning the Toronto & District Soccer League championship in 1979.

Career
In 1980, he began his professional career with Toronto Panhellenic in the Canadian National Soccer League, where they won the league playoff championship that season. He then had short spells in Mexico with Cruz Azul and Morelia. 

In 1981, he joined the Kansas City Comets of the Major Indoor Soccer League, initially being cut in preseason, before rejoining the team that season. He scored his first and only goal for the Comets on November 29 against the Wichita Wings, scoring the winning goal in overtime.

In 1982, he returned to the NSL with Dinamo Latino. In 1983, he joined the Hamilton Steelers of the Canadian Professional Soccer League. Afterwards, he returned to Dinamo Latino, finishing as leading goalscorer in the 1985 season. In 1985, he attended preseason with MISL club Chicago Sting. In 1986, Dinamo was purchased and became the Toronto Blizzard, with whom he won the 1986 NSL title. In 1987, the Blizzard moved to the Canadian Soccer League, where he played the 1987 season, scoring once in 11 appearances. 

He then returned to Chile, spending time with Everton de Viña del Mar and Coquimbo Unido, before returning to the Blizzard in 1991. In 1993, he again returned to Chile and joined Unión San Felipe.

References 

1960 births
Living people
Footballers from Santiago
Association football forwards
Chilean footballers
Cruz Azul footballers
Atlético Morelia players
Kansas City Comets (original MISL) players
Hamilton Steelers (1981–1992) players
Toronto Blizzard (1986–1993) players
Everton de Viña del Mar footballers
Coquimbo Unido footballers
Unión San Felipe footballers
Liga MX players
Canadian Professional Soccer League (original) players
Canadian National Soccer League players
Major Indoor Soccer League (1978–1992) players
Canadian Soccer League (1987–1992) players
Chilean Primera División players
Primera B de Chile players
Chilean expatriate sportspeople in Canada
Chilean expatriate sportspeople in Mexico
Chilean expatriate sportspeople in the United States
Expatriate soccer players in Canada
Expatriate footballers in Mexico
Expatriate soccer players in the United States